The following highways are numbered 180:

Australia
 Pyrenees Highway

Canada
 New Brunswick Route 180
 Prince Edward Island Route 180
 Winnipeg Route 180

Costa Rica
 National Route 180

Ireland 

  R180 road (Ireland)

Japan
 Japan National Route 180

Malaysia 

  A180 road (Malaysia) (Jalan Ayer Hitam Labu)
  North–South Port Link (Federal Route 180)

Mexico
 Mexican Federal Highway 180
Mexican Federal Autopista 180D

Russia 

  A180 highway (Russia)

United Kingdom 

  A180 road (England)
  M180 motorway

United States
 Interstate 180 (disambiguation)
Interstate 180 (Illinois)
Interstate 180 (Nebraska)
Interstate 180 (Pennsylvania)
Interstate 180 (Wyoming)
 U.S. Route 180
 Alabama State Route 180
 Arizona State Route 180A
 Arkansas Highway 180
 California State Route 180
 Florida State Road 180 (former)
 Georgia State Route 180
Hawaii Route 180
 Illinois Route 180
 K-180 (Kansas highway) (former)
 Kentucky Route 180
 Louisiana Route 180
 Maine State Route 180
 Maryland Route 180
 M-180 (Michigan highway) (former)
 Missouri Route 180
 New Jersey Route 180 (former)
 New York State Route 180
 North Carolina Highway 180
 Ohio State Route 180
 Oregon Route 180
 Tennessee State Route 180
 Texas State Highway 180
 Texas State Highway Spur 180
 Farm to Market Road 180 (Texas)
 Utah State Route 180
 Virginia State Route 180
 West Virginia Route 180
 Wisconsin Highway 180
Territories
 Puerto Rico Highway 180